Thomas Davies  (born 1865) was a Welsh international footballer. He was part of the Wales national football team, playing one match on 29 March 1886 against England.

Club career
At club level he played for Oswestry and Chester.

After Football
After football, he managed Salmon's Vaults, Chester. He moved to Flint in 1899, where he took charge of the Royal Oak Hotel.

Death
He died in Flint in December 1902.

See also
 List of Wales international footballers (alphabetical)

References

External links
 
 

1865 births
1902 deaths
Place of birth missing
Date of death missing
Welsh footballers
Wales international footballers
Association football forwards
Oswestry Town F.C. players